Turricostellaria is a genus of sea snails, marine gastropod mollusks, in the family Costellariidae, the ribbed miters.

Species
Species within the genus Turricostellaria include:
 Turricostellaria amphissa Simone & Cunha, 2012
 Turricostellaria apyrahi Simone & Cunha, 2012
 Turricostellaria jukyry Simone & Cunha, 2012
 Turricostellaria leonardhilli Petuch, 1987
 Turricostellaria lindae Petuch, 1987
 Turricostellaria ovir Simone & Cunha, 2012

References

 Petuch E.J. (1987). New Caribbean molluscan faunas. Charlottesville, Virginia: The Coastal Education and Research Foundation. 154 pp., 29 pls; addendum 2 pp., 1 pl.

External links
 Fedosov A.E., Puillandre N., Herrmann M., Dgebuadze P. & Bouchet P. (2017). Phylogeny, systematics, and evolution of the family Costellariidae (Gastropoda: Neogastropoda). Zoological Journal of the Linnean Society. 179(3): 541-626

Costellariidae